Alton Water (or Alton Reservoir) is a manmade reservoir located on the Shotley peninsula.

Construction
Due to a shortage of water in the Ipswich area in the 1960s, a list of twenty potential sites for reservoirs was made, with Alton being the chosen site.  The land was mainly farmland, but was also home to a mill and Alton Hall.  The mill was dismantled and reconstructed at the Museum of East Anglian Life in Stowmarket.

Construction and the filling with water took 13 years to complete. Alton Reservoir was opened in 1987 and is fed from the River Gipping and bore holes on the north side of the River Orwell. Between 85% and 95% of the water goes to Ipswich and Felixstowe via the Wherstead reservoir and the Orwell Bridge with the remainder fed to the villages of the Shotley Peninsula and south Suffolk.

Uses
Other uses include:
Fishing: in the late 1980s and through the 1990s the reservoir was one of the top match fisheries due to the large shoals of bream and roach.
Sailing and watersports
Birdwatching
Great East Swim: a mass participation open water swim.

Cultural references
 The reservoir is nicknamed "Gitche Gumee" by a character in the Strong Winds trilogy of children's novels by British writer Julia Jones.

References

Drinking water reservoirs in England
Tourist attractions in Suffolk
Reservoirs in Suffolk
Babergh District